Henri Bellivier (6 June 1890 – 14 March 1980) was a French cyclist. He competed in two events at the 1920 Summer Olympics.

References

External links
 

1890 births
1980 deaths
French male cyclists
Olympic cyclists of France
Cyclists at the 1920 Summer Olympics
Sportspeople from Gironde
Cyclists from Nouvelle-Aquitaine